Minuscule 167 (in the Gregory-Aland numbering), ε 305 (Soden), is a Greek minuscule manuscript of the New Testament, on parchment. Palaeographically it has been assigned to the 13th century. It has marginalia.

Description
The codex contains a complete text of the four Gospels on 264 parchment leaves (size ). The text is written in one column per page, in 25 lines per page. The initial letters in gold, the ink is brown.

The Pericope Adulterae (John 7:53-8:11) is marked by an obelus.

Text
The Greek text of the codex is a representative of the Byzantine text-type. Hermann von Soden classified it to the textual family Kr. Aland placed it in Category V.

According to the Claremont Profile Method it belongs to the textual family Kr in Luke 1 and Luke 20. In Luke 10 no profile was made. It creates textual cluster 167.

History
It was examined by Birch (about 1782) and Scholz (1794–1852). C. R. Gregory saw it in 1886.

It is currently housed at the Vatican Library (Barb. gr. 287), at Rome.

See also

 List of New Testament minuscules
 Biblical manuscript
 Textual criticism

References

Further reading
 V. Puntoni, Per la Sticometria degli Scritti del Nuovo Testamento, in: Studi italiani di filologia classica 3 (Florence, 1895), p. 495.

Greek New Testament minuscules
13th-century biblical manuscripts
Manuscripts of the Vatican Library